Strangler fig is the common name for a number of tropical and subtropical plant species in the genus Ficus, including those that are commonly known as banyans. Some of the more well-known species are:

 Ficus altissima
 Ficus aurea, also known as the Florida strangler fig
 Ficus benghalensis
 Ficus benjamina
 Ficus burtt-davyi
 Ficus citrifolia
 Ficus craterostoma
 Ficus tinctoria
 Ficus macrophylla
 Ficus obliqua
 Ficus virens
Ficus watkinsiana
Ficus henneana

These all share a common "strangling" growth habit that is found in many tropical forest species, particularly of the genus Ficus. This growth habit is an adaptation for growing in dark forests where the competition for light is intense. Strangler figs suck up the nutrients from its victims, causing them to die eventually. These plants are hemiepiphytes, spending the first part of their life without rooting into the ground. Their seeds, often bird-dispersed, germinate in crevices atop other trees. These seedlings grow their roots downward and envelop the host tree while also growing upward to reach into the sunlight zone above the canopy.

An original support tree can sometimes die, so that the strangler fig becomes a "columnar tree" with a hollow central core.  However, it is also believed that the strangler fig can help its support tree survive storms.

Strangler trees are able to colonize the challenging habitat found on the sides of buildings in urban areas. Strangler figs in the tropics are pre-adapted to adopt an aerophytic as well as "acrobatic" urban life by clinging on to building envelopes.

Gallery

See also 
 Ficus benjamina -  weeping fig, benjamin fig or ficus tree

References

External links

 The Tropical Rain Forest, including photos of strangler figs
 The Queen of Trees: Fig Trees – From the Sacred to the Strangler
 Being strangled may save this tree’s life

 
Epiphytes

de:Feigen#Würgefeigen